KAAD-LP is a low power radio station located in Sonora, California. It is licensed to the Tuolumne County Arts Alliance and began broadcasting on September 24, 2014.

References

External links
 Official website
 

Mass media in Tuolumne County, California
Radio stations established in 2017
2017 establishments in California
AAD-LP
AAD-LP

Community radio stations in the United States